The Adventures of Pussycat was a one-shot comics magazine that reprinted the risqué, black-and-white feature "Pussycat" that ran throughout various men's adventure magazines published by Martin Goodman's Magazine Management Company in the 1960s. The feature's creative staff came largely from Magazine Management's sister company, Marvel Comics, which is listed in the indices as publisher.

Publication history

Men's magazine feature
A bawdy but non-pornographic, tongue-in-cheek secret agent comics feature, "Pussycat" was launched following the success of Harvey Kurtzman and Will Elder's color comics feature "Little Annie Fanny", published in Playboy magazine from 1962 to the 1980s. Long-established comic-book artist Wally Wood — whose own similar 1968-1974 Sally Forth would run in armed services publications — created the 1965 premiere, in which Pussycat, a secretary for S.C.O.R.E. (Secret Council of Ruthless Extroverts) is recruited to fight the agency's archenemsis, L.U.S.T.

The feature premiered in Male Annual #3 (1965), and ran in at least Male Annual #4-5 (1966–1967), Stag Annual #3 (1966), and in issues of Men and Stag.

As Jim Mooney recalled in 2000, "[I]n the early '70s, I did work for Goodman's men's magazines, a strip called 'Pussycat'. Stan [Lee] wrote the first one I did, and then his brother Larry [Lieber] wrote the ones that came later".

The later strips abandoned this spy format and turned her into an investigative reporter, who continually managed to find herself in situations where her clothes were torn off or voluntarily removed for various reasons. Usually, this was played to her advantage, as she used the distractions to stop the nefarious plots of the bad guys.

Other talent from Goodman's Marvel Comics who contributed to the "Pussycat" series include writer Ernie Hart, and artists Al Hartley and Bill Everett. Contributing separately was the notable "good girl art" cartoonist Bill Ward.

Comics magazine
Eight five-page episodes were collected in a one-shot, black-and-white comics magazine published by Marvel Comics. Cover-dated October 1968, it is titled The Adventures of Pussycat on its trademarked cover logo and simply Pussycat in the copyright information in its postal indicia. The cover price of 35 cents matched that of the black-and-white Marvel magazine The Spectacular Spider-Man, released the same year but with an original, newly published story.

The one-shot has no ads except a back-cover advertisement for Jade East cologne. It also contains an unclothed but non-nude centerfold. In addition to seven reprinted stories, the comic included an original five-page Pussycat tale, "The Hidden Hippie Caper", by writer Larry Lieber and artist Jim Mooney.

Larry Graber is credited as the comic book's art director, and Lew Holloway as associate art director.

Episodes

This list is incomplete, and except for the first episode, the order is uncertain

Episodes appearing in The Adventures of Pussycat All are reprints except final story.
 "The Mirthful Misadventures of a Merry, Mixed-Up Miss!" by Wally Wood (penciler)
Male Annual #3 (1965)
"The Mirthful Misadventures of a Naughty Nonsensical Nymphet!" by Al Hartley (artist)
Stag Annual #3 (1966)
 "The Madly Mirthful Misadventures of a Lively Little Lass" by Bill Ward (artist)
Male Annual #4 (1966)
 "The Cool and Carefree Capers of a Curvy Cuddly Chick" by Bill Ward (artist)
Stag Annual #4 (1967)
 "The Cavortin' Case of The Booby-Trapped Bra" by Bill Ward (artist)
Male Annual #5 (1967)
Reprinted in Stag Annual #7 (May 1970); Cartoon Capers vol. 5, #3 (June 1970); Popular Cartoons vol. 12, #50 (April 1980)
 "Damsel in Disguise" by Bill Ward (artist)
Stag Annual #5 (1968)
Reprinted Stag Annual #5 (1968); Cartoons and Gags vol. 16, #6 (Dec. 1969); Cartoon Fun and Comedy vol. 15, #99 (Jan. 1981)
 "Another Capricious Caper of the Country's Most Cataclysmically Cuddlesome Curvaceous Cutie" by Bill Ward (artist)
Men Annual #2 (1968)
Reprinted in Cartoon Laughs vol. 9, #1 (Jan. 1970); Cartoon Fun and Comedy vol. 15, #98 (Oct. 1980)
 "The Madly Mirthful Misadventures of a Most Generously Endowed Modern Miss" by Bill Ward (artist)
Men Annual #1 (1967)
Reprinted in Laugh Parade vol. 10, #1 (Jan. 1970)
 "The Hidden Hippie Caper" by Jim Mooney (artist)
The Adventures of Pussycat (Oct. 1968)
Reprinted in Cartoon Laughs vol. 9, #4 (July 1970): Cartoon Capers vol. 6, #4  (Sept. 1971); Popular Jokes vol. 15, #73 (Nov. 1979); Popular Jokes vol. 15, #78 (Feb. 1981)

Other episodes (listed roughly chronologically)
"The Mischievous Memoirs of a Merry Little Miss!" by Jim Mooney (artist)
Male vol. 18, #3 (March 1968)
"The Capricious Capers of a Curvy Cutie-Pie!" by Bill Ward (artist)
Male vol. 18, #4 (April 1968)
"The Sizzlin' Saga of a Secret-Agent Swinger" by Bill Ward (artist)
Male vol. 18, #5 (May 1968)
"The Pin-Up Calendar Caper: The Mirthful Misadventures of a Most Magnificently Proportioned Miss" by Jim Mooney (artist)
Male (June 1968)
"America's Favorite Dynamite Blonde" by Jim Mooney (artist), signed
Male (July 1968) (3 pp.)
"The Bombshell and the Bank!"
Male Annual #6 (1968)
"The Crazy Case of the Crazy Cases!" (final S.C.O.R.E. story)
Male (Aug. 1968)
"The Computer and the Cutie"
Male vol. 18, #9 (Sept. 1968)
"The Mixed-Up Model" by Jim Mooney (artist), signed
Male (Oct. 1968) (4 pp.)
"Frenzy In France"
Male (Dec. 1968)
"The Spaceman and the Sweetie!"
Male (Feb. 1969)
 "The Castaway Cutie" by Jim Mooney (artist), signed
Male (March 1969)
"The Lady on the Late Show!"
Men (April 1969)
"My Album" by Jim Mooney (artist), signed
Men (May 1969) (4 pp.)
"How Groovy Is My Movie"  by Jim Mooney (artist), signed
Men (June 1969)
"The Kid Flips Her Id!"
Men (July 1969)
Reprinted in Cartoon Capers vol. 8, #3 (May 1973)
"It's a Gass Lass"
Men (Aug. 1969)
Reprinted in Cartoon Capers vol. 5, #2 (April 1970); Laugh Parade vol. 10, #6 (Nov. 1970); Cartoon Capers vol. 6, #2 (May 1971); Laugh Parade vol. 11, #5 (Oct. 1971); Cartoons and Gags vol. 20, #2 (March 1973); Cartoon Capers vol. 9, #2 (March 1974); Laugh Parade vol. 14, #6 (Dec. 1974); Fun House vol. 20, #8 (May 1979)
"The Lady Is a Star" by Jim Mooney (artist), signed
Men vol. 18, #9 (Sept. 1969)
"The Gal Gets Her Goal!"
Men (Oct. 1969)  (4 pp.)
Reprinted in Male Annual #8 (June 1970)
"For Better or For Nurse"
Men (Nov. 1969) (4 pp.)
"The Joke's on Her"
Men (Dec. 1969) (4 pp.)
Reprinted in Cartoons and Gags vol. 17, #2 (April 1970)
"Look Ma... I'm Flyin'"
Stag Annual #6 (1969)
'"The Swingin' Statue!"
Men Annual #3 (1969) (5 pp.)
"The Newest Misadventure of our Cuddly Little Cutie" by Jim Mooney (artist)
Male Annual #7 (1969); Stag Annual (1971)
"'Twas the Night Before Xmas..."
Men (Jan. 1970)
"Her Wild, Wild Wheels!"
Men (Feb. 1970)
Reprinted in Cartoon Capers (Oct. 1970); Cartoon & Gags (May 1973); Laugh Parade (April 1974); Best Cartoons (Feb. 1975); Popular Cartoons (Jan. 1977)
 "Two Weeks with Play" by Jim Mooney (artist)
Men (March 1970)
Stag Annual (July 1970); 'Laugh Parade  vol. 10, #4 (July 1970); Cartoon Capers vol. 5, #6 (Nov.  1970); Laugh Parade  vol. 11, #3 (June 1971); Cartoons and Gags vol. 18, #5 (Nov.  1971; pp. 60-63); Cartoon Capers vol. 7, #4 (July 1972); Laugh Parade  vol. 13, #4 (Aug.  1973); Cartoon Capers vol. 10, #2 (March 1975); Fun House  vol. 21,  #9 (Aug. 1979)
"Pandemonium at the Company Picnic"Men (April 1970)
Reprinted in Cartoons and Gags vol. 17, #4 (1970)
"Why The West Was Wild"Men (May 1970)
Reprinted in Male Annual #11 (1970)
"--But Don't Go Near the Water!"Men (July 1970)
Reprinted in Cartoons and Gags vol. 18, #4 (Sept. 1971)
"She Makes It with the Mafia!"Men (Aug. 1970)
"The Hostess with the Mostest"Men (Sept. 1970) (4 pp.)
Reprinted in Stag Annual #12 (1972); Best Cartoons from the Editors of Male & Stag vol. 4, #4 (July 1973)
"She's Out In Front!"Men (Oct 1970) (4 pp.)
Reprinted in Male Annual #16 (1973)
"No News Is Good Nudes!" by Jim Mooney (artist)Men (Nov. 1970)
Reprinted in Male vol. 21, #6 (1971); Popular Cartoons vol. 12, #55 (Oct. 1980)
"It Happened in Paris: The Crazy Capers of Our Curviest Chick"Men Annual #4 (1970); For Men Only Annual  vol. 17, #6 (1970)
"Temptress in a Taxi! ...Or, Caught with Her Flag Down!" by Larry Lieber (writer) and Jim Mooney (artist)Men (Dec. 1970) (first with full creator credits)
"Circus Siren ... or The Biggest Top of Them All!" by Larry Lieber (writer),  Jim Mooney (artist), creditedMen (Feb. 1971)
Reprinted in Cartoons and Gags vol. 19, #6 (Nov. 1972); Best Cartoons from the Editors of Male & Stag pp. 60-63 (date n.a.)
 "Bust Out at the Big House" by Larry Lieber (writer), Jim Mooney (artist), signedMen (March 1971)
Reprinted in Cartoon Laughs vol. 10, #6 (Dec.  1971); Cartoon Laughs vol. 12, #4 (Aug. 1973); Cartoon Capers vol. 9, #5 (Sept.  1974)
"A Racey Tale" by Larry Lieber (writer), Jim Mooney (artist)Men (April 1971)
Reprinted in Men Annual #13 (1972)
"Hijack Havoc! or... Foiled in the Fuselage!"Men (May 1971)
Reprinted in Male Annual #13 (Nov. 1971)
"Scandinavian Sex PlotMen (June 1971)
Reprinted in Popular Cartoons vol. 10, #39 (April 1977)
"Maid in Paris! ...or, The Hottest Jewels In Town!" by Larry Lieber (writer) and Jim Mooney (artist)Men (July 1971) (4 pp.)
"Venus and Venice" by Jim Mooney (artist)Men (Aug. 1971)
"My Fair Fraulein!" by Larry Lieber (writer) and Jim Mooney (artist)Men (Sept. 1971)
Reprinted in Best Cartoons (Male & Stag) vol. 3, #1 (Jan. 1972)
 "High Voltage! or ... I Get a Charge Out of You!" by Larry Lieber (writer),  Jim Mooney (artist), signedMen (Oct. 1971)
Reprinted in Stag Annual #15 (1973); Cartoons and Gags vol. 19, #4 (July 1972); Popular Cartoons vol. 10, #38 (July 1972); Cartoon Capers vol. 8, #5 (Sept. 1973)
"I, A Spy!"Men (Nov. 1971)
Reprinted in Cartoon Laughs vol. 13, #2 (April 1974)
"Crime and Lusciousment"Men (Dec. 1971)
"Sex and the Single Spy!" by Larry Lieber (writer) and Jim Mooney (artist)
(Reprinted in?) Stag Annual #11 (1971); Best Cartoons from the Editors of Male & Stag'
"A Two-Round Knockout! (or Saved by the Belle!)"
Men (Jan. 1972)
Reprinted in Laugh Parade vol. 12, #3 (1972) (4 pp.)
"Cycle Siren, or, Hand Me That Wench!"
Men (Feb. 1972)
Reprinted in Best Cartoons (For Men Only)  #1 (1974)
"The Sexpot and the Sultan"
Men (March 1972)
"Bullets, Boodles, and Broads!" by Larry Lieber (writer), Jim Mooney (artist)
Men (April 1972) (4 pp.)
Reprinted in Best Cartoons from the Editors of Male & Stag vol. 4, #1 (Jan. 1973)
"The Phantom of the Uproar!"
Men (June 1972)
"Mobster Mayhem! or, The Most Chased Girl In Town!"
Men (July 1972)
Reprinted in Best Cartoons (Male & Stag) vol. 5, #6 (Dec 1974)
"Maid on a Mountain, or Dig Those Peaks!"
Men (Aug. 1972)
Reprinted in Laugh Parade (Dec. 1972); Cartoons and Gag (Aug. 1973); Laugh Parade (June 1974); Best Cartoons (Male & Stag) vol. 6, #3 (April 1975); Popular Cartoons (July 1977); Fun House (Aug. 1981; final appearance of feature)
"A Peach on the Beach"
Male (Nov. 1968)
Reprinted in Cartoons and Gags vol. 18, #2 (May 1971); Cartoon Laughs vol. 12, #1 (Feb. 1973); Cartoons and Gags vol. 21, #1 (Jan. 1974)
"Vegas Vixen! or ... The Gal with the Winning Pair" by Larry Lieber (writer),  Jim Mooney (artist), credited
Men (May 1972)
Reprinted in Cartoons and Gags vol. 20,  #1

References

External links

 Tony's Online Tips, July 2, 2003 
 What's Up, Pussycat? 
Thompson, Steven Paul, "Pussycat, Pussycat ... A Look at Marvel's Most Curvaceous (and Obscure) Super-Spy", Amazing Heroes #172 (Oct. 1989)

Erotic comics
1968 comics debuts